Aechmea cariocae is a plant species in the genus Aechmea. This species is endemic to Tijuca National Park in Brazil.

References

cariocae
Flora of Brazil
Plants described in 1955